The pool stage of the 2003–04 Heineken Cup.

Pool 1

Pool 2

Pool 3

Pool 4

Pool 5

Pool 6

Seeding and runners-up

See also
 2003-04 Heineken Cup

External links
 

Pool Stage
Heineken Cup pool stages